Nicoletti Lake is a lake in the Province of Enna, Sicily, Italy.

Lakes of Sicily